The IMOCA 60 Class yacht L'Occitane en Provence, FRA 2 was designed by Sam Manuard and launched on the 31st January 2020 after being assembled by Black Pepper Yachts based in Nantes, France. With the hull moulding done by Pauger Composites in Hungary. 

This is the designer and builders first IMOCA 60 and it incorporates a lot of thinking of the designer Mini 6.5 and Class 40 yachts. It is the first SCOW design hull and had a different approach to the foil configuration than all the other designs. The main difference being the ability to retract the foils.

Racing Results

Timeline

2018, Jack In The Box, FRA 2
Construction Begins

2019–2021, L'Occitane en Provence, FRA 2

2021–present, Bureau Vallée 3

References 

Individual sailing yachts
2020s sailing yachts
Sailboat type designs by Sam Manuard
Sailboat types built in France
Sailboat types built in Hungary
Vendée Globe boats
IMOCA 60